The women's +67 kg competition of the taekwondo events at the 2019 Pan American Games took place on July 29 at the Polideportivo Callao.

Results

Main bracket
The final results were:

Repechage

References

External links
 Results brackets

Taekwondo at the 2019 Pan American Games
2019 in women's taekwondo